North Yorkshire County Record Office holds the archives for the North Yorkshire area. The archives are held at Malpas Road, Northallerton, and run by North Yorkshire County Council.

References

County record offices in England
History of Yorkshire
Northallerton